Dictyomeridium is a genus of corticolous (bark-dwelling), crustose lichens in the family Trypetheliaceae. It has eight species.

Taxonomy
The genus was circumscribed in 2016 by lichenologists André Aptroot, Matthew Nelson, and Robert Lücking, with Dictyomeridium proponens assigned as the type species. The seven species they included in the genus were mostly previously classified in the genus Polymeridium, while the type species was known by different names in the genus Campylothelium. Phylogenetic analysis showed that the group of species was distant from the core group of their previous genus. An eight species, from Australia, was added to the genus in 2022.

Description
Sometimes,  are present.

Species
 Dictyomeridium amylosporum  – pantropical
 Dictyomeridium campylothelioides  – Asia
 Dictyomeridium immersum  – Brazil
 Dictyomeridium isohypocrellinum  – Brazil
 Dictyomeridium lueckingii  – Bolivia
 Dictyomeridium paraproponens  – Brazil
 Dictyomeridium proponens  – pantropical
 Dictyomeridium tasmanicum  – Tasmania, Australia

References

Trypetheliaceae
Dothideomycetes genera
Lichen genera
Taxa described in 2016
Taxa named by André Aptroot
Taxa named by Robert Lücking